William Stewart McFaul (born 1 October 1943), known as Willie or Iam McFaul, is a Northern Irish former football player and now coach. He spent most of his career with Newcastle United.

McFaul was born in Coleraine. He joined Newcastle United from Linfield in his native Northern Ireland in 1966 after impressing in a friendly match. It took two years for him to establish himself as Newcastle's goalkeeper, a position he held until after the 1974–75 season. A notable moment in his career came when he helped Newcastle to the 1974 FA Cup Final at Wembley. Newcastle were beaten 3-0 by Liverpool, whose first two goals were from shots by Kevin Keegan and Steve Heighway that McFaul got his fingertips to but was unable to stop. McFaul played six times for Northern Ireland. Many conjecture he would have played more times except for the fact that the position was held by Pat Jennings, one of the era's finest goalkeepers. McFaul was part of the Newcastle team that won the Inter-Cities Fairs Cup in 1969.

He went on to serve Newcastle as player, coach, assistant manager and then finally, in 1985, as manager. He departed in October 1988 after a poor start saw early season optimism turn into an ultimately futile struggle against relegation.

McFaul's reputation was as a caring and loyal manager, who got the best out of a number of players including Peter Beardsley and Paul Goddard and Martin Lewis. His biggest contribution was probably his decision to make Paul Gascoigne an integral part of the first team despite his being only 18 at the time. McFaul has since managed teams in Northern Ireland and worked as the coach of the national team of Guam. In Northern Ireland he managed his hometown club Coleraine who are very close to his heart. Things didn't go to plan and his spell as manager coincided with a lowly period in Coleraine history. He did, however, discover Paul Gaston, who went on to captain Coleraine and play over 600 games for the club.

McFaul is now working as a scout for Norwich City, professional connections having been made with Norwich Manager Glenn Roeder during Roeder's time as Newcastle United manager.

Many Northern Ireland fans reflect that his true ability was never fully seen at international level due to it being the Pat Jennings era.

Newcastle United manager
Willie McFaul was appointed caretaker manager of Newcastle United in August 1985 after Jack Charlton had resigned after a pre-season friendly against Sheffield United after a row with the Newcastle fans over the sale of Chris Waddle and the failure to sign Eric Gates from Ipswich Town. His first game in charge was away to Southampton, where he made the bold decision to make 18-year-old Paul Gascoigne the playmaker of the team. By the end of August, Newcastle had beaten Liverpool 1–0, a result that was good enough to earn McFaul a permanent deal as manager.

Ian Stewart and Alan Davies were early signings as Newcastle made a great start to the 1985–86 season. By November, they were in the top six, with McFaul signing giant striker Billy Whitehurst to boost the forward line. More impressive results followed, including a 2–2 draw with champions Everton and a 1–1 draw at Anfield against Liverpool, as well as beating Brian Clough's Nottingham Forest away 2–1 and beating Arsenal 1–0 at St James' Park with Glenn Roeder getting the winner. Newcastle finished the season in 11th place, a good position for McFaul given the chaos at the start of the season when he took over as manager.

Little transfer activity over the summer of 1986 meant that Newcastle had a bad start to the 1986–87 season and found them bottom of the table in November. McFaul was given money to spend and he brought in Andy Thomas and spent a club record £400,000 on Paul Goddard from West Ham United. Goddard's arrival inspired the team to wins over Chelsea, West Ham United and Nottingham Forest. Newcastle were still bottom in March 1987 and they found help from Gascoigne and Goddard, with Goddard equalling a club record of scoring in seven straight games, to finish the season in mid-table.

Peter Beardsley was sold to Liverpool on the eve of the 1987–88 season for a British record £1.9m, to the anger of Newcastle's fans. McFaul signed Brazil's flamboyant striker Mirandinha to replace Beardsley, and with Wimbledon winger Glyn Hodges coming in as well as Irish teenager Michael O'Neill, Newcastle had their best season under McFaul finishing eighth, with Gascoigne taking all the plaudits winning the PFA Young Player of the Year award. The summer of 1988 brought McFaul's biggest challenge as manager of Newcastle United, as key players Paul Gascoigne, Neil McDonald and Paul Goddard were sold for a combined fee of £3.7M, to the dismay of the Toon Army. With huge gaps in the team McFaul went on a shopping spree buying goalkeeper Dave Beasant for £700,000, defender Andy Thorn for £800,000, winger John Hendrie for £500,000, and Hearts striker John Robertson for £800,000. Despite Gascoigne's sale Newcastle fans were in great spirits for the opening game of the season, as 3,000 travelled down to Goodison Park. Newcastle lost 4–0 with Tony Cottee bagging a hat-trick. A battling 2–2 draw with Tottenham Hotspur seemed to have been the start for McFaul, but no wins in the next four matches saw his Newcastle side under severe pressure, but they pulled off a great win at champions Liverpool 2–1 with Mirandinha and Hendrie scoring. A 3–0 defeat at home to Coventry City spelt the end for McFaul, who had only been given the job three years earlier for a couple of matches and had given his all for Newcastle United.

References

External links
Willie McFaul, Post War English & Scottish Football League A - Z Player's Transfer Database
 Willie McFaul Interview
 Willie McFaul Interview with Belfast Telegraph
 Gazza was special

1943 births
Newcastle United F.C. players
Association footballers from Northern Ireland
Northern Ireland international footballers
Living people
Coleraine F.C. players
Coleraine F.C. managers
Linfield F.C. players
People from Coleraine, County Londonderry
Newcastle United F.C. managers
Guam national football team managers
Association football goalkeepers
Football managers from Northern Ireland
FA Cup Final players